Total Force 2 (also known as Absolute Force) is a 1997 action film co-produced, written and directed by Steven Kaman and starring Timothy Bottoms and Oleg Taktarov. The film is a sequel for Total Force (1996), that was also written and directed by Kaman and starred by Bottoms.

Premise
A corrupt politician intends to use a powerful weapon to execute an evil plan

Cast
 Timothy Bottoms as Lt. John Drake
 Oleg Taktarov as Agent Borris Checkniov 
 Tom Bresnahan as Spike
 Warren A. Stevens as Stax
 Calista Carradine as August

References

External links
 

1990s English-language films